Cocconia is a genus of fungi in the family Parmulariaceae.

The genus name of Cocconia is in honour of Girolamo Cocconi (1822-1904), an Italian teacher, botanist and professor from the University of Bologna.

The genus was circumscribed by Pier Andrea Saccardo in Syll. Fung. Vol.8 on page 738 in 1889.

Species
Cocconia aliena
Cocconia astrocaryi
Cocconia banisteriae
Cocconia capensis
Cocconia coccolobae
Cocconia concentrica
Cocconia connari
Cocconia discoidea
Cocconia guatteriae
Cocconia halleriae
Cocconia lacarangae
Cocconia macarangae
Cocconia machaerii
Cocconia miconiae
Cocconia placenta
Cocconia porrigo
Cocconia sparsa
Cocconia spurcaria
Cocconia styracis
Cocconia xylopiae

References

External links
Cocconia at Index Fungorum

Parmulariaceae